

Canadian Football News in 1887
The ORFU withdrew from the CRFU and the governing body ceased to function.  The St.John's Rugby Football Club (St.John's) formed in October 1887. The St. John's team met the Winnipeg Football Club (Winnipegs) to determine the first ever Manitoba champions. After splitting the first two games, a third game was scheduled to determine the winner. The Winnipegs won by a goal and a try to nil. All games were scored using the challenge system which credited the team with the most goals as the winner. The games were unofficially scored using the points system used by the CRU in eastern Canada. Based on the points system, the Winnipegs won all three games.

Final regular season standings
Note: GP = Games Played, W = Wins, L = Losses, T = Ties, PF = Points For, PA = Points Against, Pts = Points
*Bold text means that they have clinched the playoffs

League Champions

Playoffs

QRFU Final

ORFU City Final

ORFU College Final

ORFU Final

Dominion Championship

References

 
Canadian Football League seasons